Conklin Farm is a historic farm complex located at Hounsfield in Jefferson County, New York. The farm complex consists of a -story gable-front double-farmhouse, horse barn, milk house, and garage.  Also on the property are the ruins of a cow barn with attached silo and the ruins of a chicken coop.

It was listed on the National Register of Historic Places in 1989.

References

Houses on the National Register of Historic Places in New York (state)
Houses completed in 1905
Houses in Jefferson County, New York
National Register of Historic Places in Jefferson County, New York
1905 establishments in New York (state)